Macaranga trichocarpa is a species of Asian small trees in the family Euphorbiaceae and tribe Acalypheae, found especially in secondary tropical forests.  No subspecies are listed in the Catalogue of Life and the recorded distribution includes Indo-China and western Malesia, including Borneo.

References

External links 
 
 

trichocarpa
 Flora of Indo-China
 Flora of Malesia
Taxa named by Heinrich Zollinger
Taxa named by Johannes Müller Argoviensis